Bruide son of Foith or son of Uuid (died 641) was a king of the Picts from 635 to 641.

The Pictish Chronicle king-list gives him a reign of five years following his brother Gartnait III.

His death is reported by the Annals of Ulster and the Annals of Tigernach. He was followed by another brother, Talorc III, according to the king lists.

Bridei II might have been the father of the "Pictish princess" married to Eanfrith of Bernicia, and might explain why their son Talorgan I became the king of the Picts from 653–657.

References
 Anderson, Alan Orr, Early Sources of Scottish History A.D 500–1286, volume 1. Reprinted with corrections. Paul Watkins, Stamford, 1990.

External links
CELT: Corpus of Electronic Texts at University College Cork includes the Annals of Ulster, Tigernach, the Four Masters and Innisfallen, the Chronicon Scotorum, the Lebor Bretnach (which includes the Duan Albanach), Genealogies, and various Saints' Lives. Most are translated into English, or translations are in progress.
Pictish Chronicle

641 deaths
Pictish monarchs
7th-century Scottish monarchs
Year of birth unknown